Benzothiadiazine is a bicyclic heterocyclic benzene derivative with the heterocycle containing two nitrogens and one sulfur.

Some benzothiadiazine derivatives are used as pharmaceutical drugs, including:

 bendroflumethiazide
 chlorothiazide
 cyclothiazide
 hydrochlorothiazide
 diazoxide

References